Oregon's 5th congressional district stretches from the Southeast suburbs of Portland through the eastern half of the Willamette Valley and then reaches across the Cascades to take in Sisters and Bend.  It includes a sliver of Multnomah County, the majority of Clackamas County, the rural eastern portion of Marion County, all of Linn County, a very small section of southwest Jefferson County, and the populated northwest portion of Deschutes County.  It was significantly redrawn when Oregon gained a 6th congressional district after the 2020 Census.

The district is currently represented by Republican Lori Chavez-DeRemer, who was elected in 2022 to replace Kurt Schrader, who lost renomination to attorney Jamie McLeod-Skinner in the Democratic primary. Kurt Schrader's election marked the first time in the district's history that a new representative had the same party affiliation as the outgoing representative. It was one of 18 districts that voted for Joe Biden in the 2020 presidential election while being won or held by a Republican in 2022.

Every single representative from this district since its creation after the 1980 census has been divorced while in office until 2022.

History
The district was created in 1982 when Oregon was granted a new congressional district as a result of reapportionment from the 1980 census. Denny Smith, who had represented Oregon's 2nd congressional district in the previous Congress, was re-elected in the 5th district in 1982 after it absorbed most of the western portion of the old 2nd.

In 2002, the district shrank slightly in area due to redistricting. About half of the portion of the district that had been in Benton County was moved into the 4th district and portions of west-central Clackamas County were moved into the 3rd district. At the same time, small portions of northern Clackamas and southern Multnomah County that had previously been part of the 1st district were moved into the 5th district.

Following the 2020 Census and the subsequent redistriciting, the 5th was redrawn significantly.  It lost its western and coastal portions, including the urban portion of Salem, as well as all of Polk, Lincoln, and Tillamook counties.  It gained all of Linn County and the most populated portions of Deschutes County.  It is the most evenly divided district in partisan terms in Oregon, and has been through many iterations.

For the first time since the 1994 election, the 5th is represented by a Republican, freshman Representative Lori Chavez-DeRemer.

List of members representing the district

Recent presidential elections

Election results
Sources (official results only): 
Elections History from the Oregon Secretary of State website
Election Statistics from the website of the Clerk of the United States House of Representatives

1996

1998

2000

2002

2004

2006

2008

2010

2012

2014

2016

2018

2020

2022

Historical district boundaries
When created in 1983, the district was an inland district focused around the Willamette Valley, and consisted of all of Clackamas and Marion counties, as well as small parts of the counties of Benton, Linn, and Polk.
In 1993, the district gained a large coastal portion from the 1st district, gaining all of Tillamook and Lincoln counties as well as the rest of Polk, whilst part of Clackamas County was lost to the 3rd district.

In the 2003 and 2013 redistrictings, the changes were only minor, as the district gained a small portion of Multnomah County from the 3rd district in 2003 but lost it again in 2013, while it lost a portion of northern Clackamas County to the 3rd district in both 2003 and 2013.

In the 2023 redistricting, the district underwent major boundary changes, as it gained all of Linn County, some of Multnomah and Clackamas counties, and parts of Deschutes County including Bend, but it lost the entire coastal section it had gained in 1993 as well as the area in Polk and Benton counties to the 1st, 4th, and 6th districts. Parts of western Marion County, including the city of Salem, were also lost to the new 6th district.

See also

Oregon's congressional districts
List of United States congressional districts

References
Specific

General

 Congressional Biographical Directory of the United States 1774–present

05
Benton County, Oregon
Clackamas County, Oregon
Lincoln County, Oregon
Marion County, Oregon
Multnomah County, Oregon
Polk County, Oregon
Tillamook County, Oregon
1983 establishments in Oregon
Constituencies established in 1983